The discography of American rapper and record producer T.I. consists of eleven studio albums, one compilation album, one remix album, four extended plays (EPs), 13 mixtapes, 110 singles (including 61 as a featured artist) and 11 promotional singles. He has also released one music video album and over 60 music videos, the details of which are included in his videography.

Throughout his career, T.I.'s music has been released on several record labels, including Artista and Atlantic, as well as his own label imprint, Grand Hustle Records. T.I. has also served as an executive producer for several projects other than his own, including Big Kuntry King's debut My Turn to Eat (2008), B.G.'s Too Hood 2 Be Hollywood (2009), B.o.B's debut The Adventures of Bobby Ray (2010) and Iggy Azalea's debut EP Glory (2012), as well as her debut album The New Classic (2014). In 2005, T.I. had executive produced the soundtrack to the film Hustle & Flow and released the collection through his record label. T.I. is also a noted record producer, having produced several song recordings, a few under the pseudonym T.I.P.. He has also served as a ghostwriter and assisting songwriter for several artists, such as Bow Wow, Sean "Diddy" Combs, Dr. Dre, Bun B and Keyshia Cole.

T.I. was discovered by Kawan "KP" Prather and signed to his label imprint Ghet-O-Vision Entertainment. Upon signing a recording contract with Arista Records subsidiary LaFace Records in 2001, he shortened his name from TIP to T.I., out of respect for his Arista label-mate Q-Tip. In 2001, T.I. released his debut album, I'm Serious. The album peaked at number 98 on the US Billboard 200 chart and sold about 270,000 copies. Due to poor sales, T.I. asked for a joint venture deal with Arista or be released from his contract; he was subsequently granted his release and dropped from the label. In 2003, T.I. launched Grand Hustle Entertainment (now Grand Hustle Records) with his longtime business partner Jason Geter and signed a new deal with Atlantic Records. He then collaborated with fellow Atlanta-based rapper Bone Crusher and Killer Mike, for the song "Never Scared". The song became a hit for the summer of 2003, peaking at number 26 in the US, marking T.I.'s first appearance on the US Billboard Hot 100 chart.

T.I. released Trap Muzik, his first album under Grand Hustle/Atlantic, in 2003. It contained the lead single "24's", which had peaked at number 78 on the US Billboard Hot 100 chart, his first solo entry there. Trap Muzik later debuted at number four on the US Billboard 200 chart and was certified platinum by the Recording Industry Association of America (RIAA), making it much more successful than his previous effort. The following singles, "Rubberband Man" and "Let's Get Away", also impacted the Hot 100 chart, while "Be Easy" only charted Billboards R&B chart. His third album, Urban Legend, was released in 2004 and included the hit single "Bring 'Em Out", which peaked at number nine in the US and was certified platinum. The album peaked at number seven on the Billboard 200 and was also certified platinum in the US. Urban Legend also spawned the singles "U Don't Know Me" and "ASAP". In 2006, his fourth album King, debuted at number one and was certified gold in its first week of release. The lead single, "What You Know" peaked at number three in the US, and was certified double-platinum. King, which also serves as the official soundtrack for T.I.'s first feature film ATL, was certified platinum in the US, gold in Canada, and silver in the UK. King also included "Why You Wanna", "Live in the Sky" and "Top Back". Later that year, he earned his first number-one US single with "My Love", his collaboration with American pop singer Justin Timberlake.

T.I. released his fifth album T.I. vs. T.I.P., in 2007, which went on to become his second consecutive number-one album. The lead single "Big Shit Poppin' (Do It)", peaked at number nine in the US. The album was certified platinum in the US and gold in Canada. The other singles from the album included "You Know What It Is" and "Hurt". In 2008, before T.I.'s prison sentence, he released Paper Trail, his third number-one album in the United States, which was certified gold in its first week of release. The album included two US number-one singles with four top-five singles overall: "Whatever You Like", Swagga Like Us" (featuring Lil Wayne, Kanye West and Jay-Z), "Live Your Life" (featuring Rihanna), and "Dead and Gone" (featuring Justin Timberlake). The album, was certified double-platinum in the US, platinum in Canada, and gold in Australia, New Zealand, and the United Kingdom. In 2009, Paper Trail was re-released entitled Paper Trail: Case Closed, as an EP in the UK and included two new singles and three songs off the original album. In 2010, while serving 11 months in prison for probation violation, he released his seventh studio album No Mercy, in December 2010. No Mercy included the lead single "Get Back Up", which features American singer Chris Brown, and "That's All She Wrote", which features American rapper Eminem. The album debuted at number four in America and was certified gold by the RIAA.

In 2012, T.I. released Trouble Man: Heavy Is the Head, on December 18. The album peaked at number two in the US and was certified gold by the RIAA. The album spawned two successful singles, "Go Get It" and "Ball". Following the album's release, T.I. announced he drew a close to his 10-year contract with Atlantic Records and was searching for a new label to sign himself and Grand Hustle. In November 2013, T.I. revealed he signed a record deal with Columbia Records, to release his ninth album, then-titled Trouble Man II: He Who Wears the Crown. He would later announce he postponed Trouble Man II, after recording with longtime collaborator Pharrell Williams (who was influential in his move to Columbia), and would now release a new project titled Paperwork. The album produced two successful singles, "About the Money" and "No Mediocre".

Studio albums

Compilation albums

Remix albums

EPs

Mixtapes

Singles

As lead artist

As featured artist

Promotional singles

Other charted songs

Guest appearances
{| class="wikitable plainrowheaders" style="text-align:center;"
|+ List of non-single guest appearances, with other performing artists, showing year released and album name
! scope="col" style="width:16em;" | Title
! scope="col" | Year
! scope="col" | Other artist(s)
! scope="col" | Album
|-
! scope="row" | "2 Glock 9's"
| 2000
| Beanie Sigel 	
| Music from and Inspired by Shaft 	
|- 
! scope="row" | "Fiasco"
| rowspan="1" | 2001
| Toya
| Toya
|-
! scope="row" | "Changed Man"
| rowspan="3" | 2002
| 2Pac, Jazze Pha, Johnta Austin
| Better Dayz
|-
! scope="row" | "Keeps Spinnin"
| Birdman, Mannie Fresh, Stone, TQ, Wolf, Gillie da Kid, Mikkey, Petey Pablo
| Birdman
|-
! scope="row" | "We Represent"
| 8Ball, Lil' Flip
| Slab Muzik
|-
! scope="row" | "Get Your Weight Up"
| rowspan="4" | 2003
| Lil Jon, 8Ball
| Part II
|-
! scope="row" | "It's Going Down 2Nite"
| 112
| Hot & Wet
|-
! scope="row" | "Now What"
| Juelz Santana
| From Me to U
|-
! scope="row" | "Pretty Pink"
| David Banner, Jazze Pha, Mr. Marcus
| MTA2: Baptized in Dirty Water
|-
! scope="row" | "End of the Road"
| rowspan="15" | 2004
| Jim Jones, Bun B
| On My Way to Church
|-
! scope="row" | "Street Nigga"
| B.G.
| Life After Cash Money
|-
! scope="row" | "Fucking Around"
| Trick Daddy, Young Jeezy, Kase-1
| Thug Matrimony: Married to the Streets
|-
! scope="row" | "Goodies" (Remix)
| Ciara, Jazze Pha
| Goodies
|-
! scope="row" | "Grand Finale"
| Lil Jon, Bun B, Jadakiss, Nas, Ice Cube
| Crunk Juice
|-
! scope="row" | "Let Me Love You" (Remix)
| Mario, Jadakiss
| Turning Point
|-
! scope="row" | "Like a 24"
| Twista, Liffy Stokes
| Kamikaze
|-
! scope="row" | "Roll Call"
| Juelz Santana
| Back Like Cooked Crack, Pt. 1
|-
! scope="row" | "Look at the Grillz"
| 8Ball & MJG, Twista
| Living Legends
|-
! scope="row" | "Pimp Squad"
| The Alchemist, P$C
| 1st Infantry
|-
! scope="row" | "Pretty Toes"
| Nelly, Jazze Pha
| Suit
|-
! scope="row" | "Stomp"
|Young Buck, Ludacris
| Straight Outta Cashville
|-
! scope="row" | "Where You Wanna Be"
|Brandy
| Afrodisiac
|-
! scope="row" | "Nolia Clap" (Remix)
| UTP, Z-Ro, Bun B, Slim Thug
| Nolia Clap
|-
! scope="row" | "Still Down"
| Ashanti
| Concrete Rose
|-
! scope="row" | "Bang"
| rowspan="9" | 2005
| Young Jeezy, Lil Scrappy
| Let's Get It: Thug Motivation 101
|-
! scope="row" | "Bounce Like This"
| 
| The Longest Yard: The Soundtrack
|-
! scope="row" | "Breakin' Old Habits"
| The Notorious B.I.G., Slim Thug
| Duets: The Final Chapter
|-
! scope="row" | "Get Yours"
| Lil' Kim, Sha-Dash
| The Naked Truth
|-
! scope="row" | "I'm a G"
| Bun B
| Trill
|-
! scope="row" | "If I Hit"
| 112
| Pleasure & Pain
|-
! scope="row" | "Indiscretions in the Back of the Limo"
| DJ Quik
| Trauma
|-
! scope="row" | "So Many Diamonds"
| Paul Wall
| The Peoples Champ
|-
! scope="row"| "I'm a King"
| The Game
| You Know What It Is, Vol. 3
|-
! scope="row" | "Dip, Slide, Rideout"
| rowspan="10" | 2006
| DJ Khaled, Big Kuntry King, Young Dro
| Listennn... the Album
|-
! scope="row"| "What It Is"
| Young Dro
| rowspan="3" | Day One
|-
! scope="row"| "Trap or Kill Ya Self"
| Young Dro, Pharrell
|-
! scope="row"| "Shell"
| Young Dro
|-
! scope="row" | "Keep Talking"
| Lil' 3rd
| King of Cloverland
|-
! scope="row" | "I Got Money"
| Young Jeezy
| The Inspiration
|-
! scope="row" | "My Girl"
| Young Dro
| Best Thang Smokin'
|-
! scope="row" | "You Got the Power"
| Governor
| Son of Pain
|-
! scope="row"| "One Blood" (Remix)
| The Game, Jim Jones, Snoop Dogg, Nas, Jadakiss, Fat Joe, Lil Wayne, N.O.R.E., Styles P, Fabolous, Juelz Santana, Rick Ross, Twista, Kurupt, Daz Dillinger, WC, E-40, Bun B, Chamillionaire, Slim Thug, Young Dro, Clipse, Ja Rule, Junior Reid
| Doctor's Advocate
|-
! scope="row" | "We Fly High" (Remix)
| Jim Jones, Diddy, Birdman,Young Dro, Jermaine Dupri
| A Dipset X-Mas
|-
! scope="row" | "Show U Wut to Do Wit It"
| rowspan="10" | 2007
| rowspan="1" | Ya Boy
| rowspan="1" | Chapter 1: The Rise
|-
! scope="row" | "4 Kings"
| Young Buck, Pimp C, Jazze Pha
| Buck the World
|-
! scope="row"|"Cannon" (Remix)
||DJ Drama, Lil Wayne, Willie the Kid, Freeway
|rowspan="3"|Gangsta Grillz: The Album
|-
! scope="row"|"No More"
| DJ Drama, Lloyd, Willie the Kid
|-
! scope="row"|"Feds Takin' Pictures"
| DJ Drama, Young Jeezy, Willie the Kid, Jim Jones, Rick Ross, Young Buck
|-
! scope="row" | "King and Queen"
| rowspan="2" | Ciara
| rowspan="2" 
|-
! scope="row" | "Goodbye, My Dear"
|-
! scope="row" | "Hit the Block"
| UGK
| Underground Kingz
|-
! scope="row" | "Let It Go" (Remix)
| Keyshia Cole, Missy Elliott, Young Dro
| Just like You
|-
! scope="row" | "Slow Down"
| Wyclef Jean
| Carnival Vol. II: Memoirs of an Immigrant
|-
! scope="row" | "What Ya Gonna Do"
| rowspan="13" | 2008
| Maino
| Tuck Ya Chain In
|-
! scope="row" | "Superstar" (Remix)
| Lupe Fiasco, Young Jeezy
| Lupe Fiasco's The Cool
|-
! scope="row" | "Been Doin' This"
| Bow Wow
| New Jack City II
|-
! scope="row" | "Brand New"
| Lyfe Jennings
| Lyfe Change
|-
! scope="row" | "I'm Dat Nigga"
| B.o.B
| Who the F#*k Is B.o.B?
|-
! scope="row" | "Hold Up"
| Nelly, LL Cool J
| Brass Knuckles
|-
! scope="row" | "It Ain't Me"
| T-Pain, Akon
| Thr33 Ringz
|-
! scope="row" | "Need U Bad" (Remix)
| Jazmine Sullivan, Missy Elliott
| Fearless
|-
! scope="row" | "Love in This Club" (Remix)
| Usher, Young Jeezy
| Here I Stand
|-
! scope="row" | "Hi Hater" (Remix)
| Maino, Swizz Beatz, Plies, Jadakiss, Fabolous
| Maino Is the Future
|-
! scope="row" | "Sip It"
| Ernie Gaines
| rowspan="3" 
|-
! scope="row" | "We Stay Fly"
| Dolla
|-
! scope="row" | "If I"
| Justin Timberlake
|-
! scope="row" | "A-Town"
| rowspan="8" | 2009
| DJ Drama, Young Dro, Sean P, Lonnie Mac
| Gangsta Grillz: The Album (Vol. 2)
|-
! scope="row" | "Don't Believe 'Em"
| Busta Rhymes, Akon
| Back on My B.S.
|-
! scope="row" | "For Real"
| Mullage
| Elevators: The Pre-Album
|-
! scope="row" | "Good Love"
| Mary J. Blige
| Stronger with Each Tear
|-
! scope="row" | "Niggas Down South" (Remix)
| Killer Mike, Bun B
| Underground Atlanta
|-
! scope="row" | "Magic" (Remix)
| Robin Thicke
| 
|-
! scope="row" | "King on Set"
| Young Dro
| Music Inspired by More than a Game
|-
! scope="row" | "Boo"
| 8Ball & MJG
| 
|-
! scope="row" | "Dat's What I Thought"
| rowspan="19" | 2010
| Mac Boney, Killer Mike
| Real Talk Radio Volume 12
|-
! scope="row" | "F.I.L.A. (Fall in Love Again)"
| The-Dream
| 
|-
! scope="row" | "Big Money"
| Mac Boney
| Real Talk Radio Volume 13
|-
! scope="row" | "Care"
| Kid Rock, Martina McBride
| Born Free
|-
! scope="row" | "Rosé Red"
| Meek Mill, Rick Ross, Vado
| Mr. Philadelphia
|-
! scope="row" | "Pushin' It"
| Game, Robin Thicke
| Brake Lights
|-
! scope="row" | "Guilty"
| Usher
| Raymond v. Raymond
|-
! scope="row" | "Maybach Music III"
| Rick Ross, Jadakiss, Erykah Badu
| Teflon Don
|-
! scope="row" | "Party People"
| N.E.R.D.
| Nothing
|-
! scope="row" | "Put Your Money on Me"
| Ronald Isley
| Mr. I
|-
! scope="row" | "What They Do"
| 8Ball & MJG, Masspike Miles
| Ten Toes Down
|-
! scope="row" | "I Like It" (Remix)
| Enrique Iglesias
| 
|-
! scope="row" | "Anyway"
| EDIDON, Kastro of Outlawz
| The Stash Spot
|-
! scope="row" | "Sanford & Son"
| Quincy Jones, B.o.B., Prince Charlez, Mohombi
| Q Soul Bossa Nostra
|-
! scope="row" | "Feet Don't Fail Me Now"
| B.o.B, Spodee
| rowspan="2" | No Genre
|-
! scope="row" | "Not Lost"
| B.o.B
|-
! scope="row" | "I Like Dat"
| Trey Songz, Swizz Beatz
| Passion, Pain & Pleasure
|-
! scope="row" | "She's So Fly"
| Nelly
| 5.0
|-
! scope="row" | "Tangerine"
| Big Boi, Khujo
| Sir Luscious Left Foot: The Son of Chico Dusty
|-
! scope="row" | "Get Yo Girl"
| rowspan="5" | 2011
| Rich Kid Shawty
| Splurge on Em
|-
! scope="row" | "Pinky Ring"
| AK the Razorman
| Royal Heir
|-
! scope="row" | "Boom Bap"
| B.o.B, Mos Def
| E.P.I.C. (Every Play Is Crucial)
|-
! scope="row" | "Country Ass Nigga"
| Nelly, 2 Chainz
| O.E.MO
|-
! scope="row" | "Wanna Win"
| Rich Kid Shawty
| Shad Marley
|-
! scope="row" | "UP!" (Remix)
| rowspan="23" | 2012
| LoveRance, Young Jeezy
| rowspan="3" 
|-
! scope="row" | "Strange Clouds" (Remix)
| B.o.B, Young Jeezy
|-
! scope="row"| "Rack City" (Remix)
| Tyga, Wale, Meek Mill, Young Jeezy, Fabolous
|-
! scope="row" | "Cream"
| Maino, Meek Mill
| The Day After Tomorrow
|-
! scope="row" | "Block Blazer"
| rowspan="2" | D.O.P.E.
| rowspan="2" | D.O.P.E.
|-
! scope="row" | "Harry Potter"
|-
! scope="row" | "M.O.B."
| Big Kuntry King
| 100%
|-
! scope="row" | "Arena"
| B.o.B, Chris Brown
| Strange Clouds
|-
! scope="row" | "Plain Jane"
| Gucci Mane, Rocko
| I'm Up
|-
! scope="row" | "Bury Me a G"
| Rick Ross
| Self Made Vol. 2
|-
! scope="row" | "What's Happening"
| Prodigy
| H.N.I.C. 3
|-
! scope="row" | "Fightin Words"
| Mike Will Made It, Juicy J, Trae tha Truth
| Est. in 1989 Pt. 2
|-
! scope="row" | "Murda Bizness"
| Iggy Azalea
| Glory
|-
! scope="row" | "Pull Up"
| Freddie Gibbs, Young Jeezy
| 
|-
! scope="row" | "Bitches & Bottles (Let's Get It Started)"
| DJ Khaled, Lil Wayne, Future
| Kiss the Ring
|-
! scope="row" | "I Do This"
| Trae tha Truth, Rico Love, DJ Khaled
| rowspan="2" | Tha Blackprint
|-
! scope="row" | "Don't Like"
| Trae tha Truth
|-
! scope="row" | "On 4 Life"
| Yung Booke
| Fly Therapy
|-
! scope="row" | "Forever"
| Keyshia Cole
|Woman to Woman
|-
! scope="row" | "In the A"
| Big Boi, Ludacris
| Vicious Lies and Dangerous Rumors
|-
! scope="row"| "Hustle Gang"
| Chip, Iggy Azalea
| rowspan="3" |London Boy
|-
! scope="row"| "On the Scene"
| Chip, Young Jeezy
|-
! scope="row"| "R.N.F."
| Chip, Jeremih
|-
! scope="row"| "All Gold Everything" (Remix)
| rowspan="34"| 2013
| Trinidad James, Young Jeezy, 2 Chainz
|Don't Be S.A.F.E.
|-
! scope="row"| "Do It Then"
| TM88, Trae tha Truth, Hardo
| Crazy 8: It's A Southside Track 3
|-
! scope="row"| "No Regrets"
| Snoop Lion
| rowspan="2" 
|-
! scope="row"| "Show Out" (Remix)
| Juicy J, Pimp C
|-
! scope="row"| "I Wish It Was Music"
| Wyclef Jean, Trae tha Truth
| April Showers
|-
! scope="row" | "Roll Up"
| Problem, Snoop Dogg
| The Separation
|-
! scope="row"| "Nope"
| Young Dro
| rowspan="2" | Day Two
|-
! scope="row"| "Bars"
| Young Dro, Mac Boney, Spodee
|-
! scope="row"| "Don't Want It"
| Doe B
| Baby Jesus
|-
! scope="row"| "Have It Your Way"
| Birdman, Lil Wayne
| Rich Gang
|-
! scope="row" | "Freeze Up"
| Shad da God, Young Dro
| rowspan="3"| Gas Life
|-
! scope="row" | "Ball Out"
|| Shad da God, Young Dro, Chip
|-
! scope="row" | "I'ma Ride"
| Shad da God
|-
! scope="row"| "Pinstripes"
| Goodie Mob
| Age Against the Machine
|-
! scope="row"| "Commas" (Remix)
|L.E.P. Bogus Boys, Young Jeezy, Mase, Spenzo 
|Don't Feed Da Killaz Vol. 4 
|-
! scope="row"| "#TwerkIt" (Remix)
| Busta Rhymes, Vybz Kartel, Ne-Yo, French Montana, Jeremih
| rowspan="3"  
|-
! scope="row"| "Crickets" (Remix)
| Drop City Yacht Club, Jeremih
|-
! scope="row"| "Ain't No Coming Down" (Remix)
| Juicy J
|-
! scope="row" | "Typa Way"
| rowspan="2"| Lil Wayne
| rowspan="3"| Dedication 5
|-
! scope="row" | "FuckWitMeUKnowIGotIt"
|-
! scope="row" | "Feds Watchin"
| Lil Wayne, 2 Chainz
|-
! scope="row"| "Theme Song"
| Audio Push
| Come As You Are
|-
! scope="row" | "IDGAF"
| Nelly, Pharrell
| rowspan="1" |M.O.
|-
! scope="row"| "Get Lucky" (Remix)
| Daft Punk, Pharrell, Nile Rodgers
|  
|-
! scope="row"| "Jungle"
| Cam'ron, Yo Gotti
| Ghetto Heaven Vol. 1
|-
! scope="row"| "Bad Bitch"
| Young Dro, Spodee, Problem
| rowspan="2"| High Times
|-
! scope="row"| "Nope"
| Young Dro
|-
! scope="row"| "Jewels n' Drugs"
| Lady Gaga, Too Short, Twista
| Artpop
|-
! scope="row"| "I Feel Like Pac/I Feel Like Biggie"
| DJ Khaled, Diddy, Rick Ross, Meek Mill, Swizz Beatz
| Suffering from Success
|-
! scope="row" | "Hold Up"
| rowspan="1"| Trae tha Truth, Diddy, Young Jeezy
| rowspan="2"| I Am King
|-
! scope="row" | "Ride wit Me"
| rowspan="1"| Trae tha Truth, Meek Mill
|-
! scope="row" | "Fly Shit"
| Yung Booke
| City on My Back
|-
! scope="row"| "Tik Tik Boom"
| Britney Spears
| Britney Jean
|-
! scope="row"| "Shit" (Megamix)
| Mike Will Made It, Future, Drake, Jeezy, Schoolboy Q, Juicy J, Diddy, Pastor Troy
| #MikeWillBeenTrill
|-
! scope="row"| "What It Do"
| rowspan="34"| 2014
| Trae tha Truth
| Goodnight Don't Exist in ATL 3
|-
! scope="row" | "I Ain't Going"
| 
| rowspan="1"| The Official Super Bowl XLVIII Mixtape
|-
! scope="row"| "Watch Me Do It"
| Maino, French Montana
| King of Brooklyn
|-
! scope="row" | "P.I.M.P."
| Rocko
| Lingo 4 Dummys
|-
! scope="row" | "Hell You Sayin<ref>{{cite magazine|author=Ramirez, Erika|url=., 'Hell You Sayin Feat. Iggy Azalea, Young Dro & Travi$ Scott: Exclusive Song Premiere|magazine=Billboard|date=February 6, 2014|access-date=February 8, 2014}}</ref>
| Iggy Azalea, Young Dro, Travi$ Scott
| rowspan="3"| SXEW Vol. 1: The Grand Hustle|-
! scope="row" | "Yayo" (Remix)
| Snootie Wild, Yo Gotti
|-
! scope="row"| "I Wanna Know"
| Raekwon, Doe B
|-
! scope="row"| "OG Bobby Johnson" (ATL Remix)
| Que, Young Jeezy
| rowspan="2" 
|-
! scope="row"| "Drunk in Love" (Remix)
| Beyoncé, Jay-Z
|-
! scope="row" | "Whenever Wherever"
| Doe B, Spodee
| rowspan="4"| DOAT 3 (Definition of a Trapper)|-
! scope="row" | "Love to Hate Me"
| Doe B, Big Kuntry King, Mitchelle'l
|-
! scope="row" | "All Gas"
| Doe B, Problem, Shad da God, Trae tha Truth
|-
! scope="row" | "Still Ballin"
| Doe B, King South
|-
! scope="row" | "Girlfriend" (Hustle Gang Remix)
| Watch The Duck
| rowspan="2"| SXEW Vol. 2|-
! scope="row" | "Danny Glover"
| 
|-
! scope="row" | "Thirsty"
| Young Dro
| Black Label|-
! scope="row" | "Ain't Gon Do It" (Remix)
| Yung Booke
| rowspan="3"| Goodnight Don't Exist in ATL 4|-
! scope="row" | "Jungle Fever" (Remix)
| Que
|-
! scope="row" | "The Worst" (Remix)
| Jhené Aiko
|-
! scope="row" | "A.K.A."
| Jennifer Lopez
| A.K.A.|-
! scope="row" | "Eww Eww Eww" (Remix)
| Zuse, Young Thug
| Plugged|-
! scope="row" | "Got Me a Check"
| Yung Booke, Shad da God
| rowspan="1"| Goodnight Don't Exist in ATL 5|-
! scope="row" | "Can't Stay"
| Ty Dolla Sign
| Sign Language|-
! scope="row" | "Don't Tell 'Em" (Remix)
| Jeremih, YG
| rowspan="2"| CSA (Clubs, Studios, Airports)|-
! scope="row" | "Am I Wrong" (Remix)
| Nico & Vinz
|-
! scope="row" | "Addicted"
| Jeezy, YG
| Seen It All: The Autobiography|-
! scope="row"| "Trouble"
| Migos
| 
|-
! scope="row" | "Quintana, Pt. 2"
| Travi$ Scott
| Days Before Rodeo|-
! scope="row" | "Really"
| The Game, Yo Gotti, 2 Chainz, Soulja Boy
| Blood Moon: Year of the Wolf|-
! scope="row" | "Electric Blue"
| Nicole Scherzinger
| Big Fat Lie|-
! scope="row" | "Life Ain't Easy"
| rowspan="2"| Spodee
| rowspan="2"| The B.I.D.|-
! scope="row"| "Priorities"
|-
! scope="row"| "Me Nuh Play"
| Zuse
| rowspan="2"| Illegal Immigrant|-
! scope="row"| "What You Gon Do Bout It"
| Zuse, Trae tha Truth, Spodee
|-
! scope="row"| "One More"
| rowspan="26"| 2015
| Ne-Yo
| Non-Fiction|-
! scope="row" | "Bottoms Up (Remix)"
| Brantley Gilbert	
| rowspan="1"| Just as I Am (Platinum Edition)
|-
! scope="row"| "Bunkin'"
| Chris Brown, Tyga, Jay 305
| Fan of a Fan: The Album|-
! scope="row"| "Hennessy"
| Problem, Rich Homie Quan
| OT|-
! scope="row"| "Dope Boy Shit" (Remix)
| Bankroll Fresh
|  rowspan="1" 
|-
! scope="row"| "Off-Set"
| Young Thug
| Furious 7 (Original Motion Picture Soundtrack)|-
! scope="row"| "On the Bible"
| Tech N9ne, Zuse
| Special Effects|-
! scope="row"| "La Policia" (Remix)
| Kap G, David Banner
| Real Migo Shit 3|-
! scope="row"| "Can't Tell"
| Young Thug, Boosie Badazz
| Barter 6|-
! scope="row"| "Spoil You"
| Boosie Badazz
| Touchdown 2 Cause Hell|-
! scope="row"| "Edibles"
| Snoop Dogg
| Bush|-
! scope="row"| "I Know U Ain't Gon Act Like"
| Hardo
| Trapnati|-
! scope="row"| "If You Didn't"
| Young Thug
| rowspan="2" 
|-
! scope="row"| "Mind Right" (Remix)
| TK-N-Cash, B.o.B, T-Pain
|-
! scope="row"| "Issues"
| Skeme, RJ
| Ingleworld 2|-
! scope="row"| "Mad Generation"
| Victoria Monet
| Nightmares & Lullabies: Act II|-
! scope="row" | "Spillin Drank"
| Mitchelle'l, Big K.R.I.T.
| 
|-
! scope="row" | "Late Night King"
| Trae tha Truth, Jeremih, Ty Dolla Sign
| rowspan="1" | Tha Truth|-
! scope="row"| "Why You Mad (Infinity Remix)"
| Mariah Carey, French Montana, Justin Bieber
| 
|-
! scope="row"| "Till I Die" 
| K Camp
| Only Way Is Up|-
! scope="row" | "Gold BBS's"
| Shad da God
| rowspan="1"| 2000 and God|-
! scope="row" | "Don't Blame Luv"
| rowspan="2" | Watch The Duck
| rowspan="2" | The Trojan Horse|-
! scope="row" | "Hustler"
|-
! scope="row"| "Twerk Something"
| Pimp C
| Long Live the Pimp|-
! scope="row"| "Blasé" (Remix)
| Ty Dolla Sign, French Montana, ASAP Ferg
| 
|-
! scope="row"| "Dipped in Gold"
| P. Reign, Young Thug
| Off the Books|-
! scope="row"| "Back to Business"
| rowspan="14"| 2016
| Dr. Dre, Justus, Victoria Monet, Sly Piper
| rowspan="2" 
|-
! scope="row"| "How Many Times (Remix)"
| 5ive Mics, King Louie
|-
! scope="row"| "Let Me Live"
| Trae tha Truth, B.o.B, Ink
| rowspan="1" | Tha Truth, Pt. 2|-
! scope="row"| "Forever and a Day"
| J.U.S.T.I.C.E. League
| rowspan="1" | J.U.S.T.I.C.E. for All|-
! scope="row"| "Cut It (Remix)"
| O.T. Genasis, Lil Wayne
| rowspan="1" 
|-
! scope="row"| "Long Time Ago"
| Trae tha Truth
| rowspan="1"| Another 48 Hours|-
! scope="row"| "Can I"
| DJ Drama, Young Thug
| rowspan="1" | Quality Street Music 2|-
! scope="row"| "Bobby Womack"
| Young Thug
| rowspan="1"| Margiela Music 3|-
! scope="row"| "Designer Designer"
| Big Kuntry King
| rowspan="1"| Lil Dope Boy Kane|-
! scope="row"| "I Will"
| My Guy Mars
| rowspan="1"| No Days Off|-
! scope="row"| "Foreva"
| Young Dolph
| rowspan="1"| Rich Crack Baby|-
! scope="row"| "Get Racks"
| O.T. Genasis
| rowspan= "1"| Coke N Butter|-
! scope="row"| "Ladies"
| B.o.B
| rowspan= "1"| Don't Call It A Christmas Album|-
! scope="row"| "Girlfriend (Remix)"
| Kap G, 2 Chainz, Ty Dolla $ign, Quavo
| rowspan= "1"| Goodnight Don't Exist in ATL 11|-
! scope="row" | "Iced Out My Arms"
| rowspan="9" | 2017
| DJ Khaled, Future, Migos, 21 Savage
| Grateful|-
! scope="row" | "Wildin'"
| Trouble
| 16|-
! scope="row"| "Trenches (Remix)"
| Peanut da Don
| rowspan= "1"| Goodnight Don't Exist in ATL 12|-
! scope="row" | "Stop It'"
| French Montana
| Jungle Rules|-
! scope="row" | "How to Be a Player"
| Too Short, E-40, Ray J
| The Pimp Tape|-
! scope="row" | "Don't Make You Real"
| Young Thug
| 
|-
! scope="row" | "Ghetto"
| Trae tha Truth, Wyclef, Ink
| Tha Truth, Pt. 3|-
! scope="row" | "Rake It Up (Remix)"
| Yo Gotti, Nicki Minaj, Too Short
| 
|-
! scope="row" | "Big Bank"
| Big K.R.I.T.
| 4eva Is a Mighty Long Time|-
! scope="row" | "Laugh at You"
| rowspan="3" | 2018
| 
| Madden NFL 19|-
! scope="row" | "What I Been Thru"
| London Jae, B.o.B
| Gunz & Roses|-
! scope="row" | "Catch this Wave"
| Translee
| Freedom Summer|-
! scope="row"| "Ladies, Ladies, Ladies"
| rowspan="2" | 2019
| JID
| Revenge of the Dreamers III|-
! scope="row"| "Cut Me a Break"
| Free Nationals
|Free Nationals
|-
! scope="row"| "All In"
| 2020
| Nasty C
| Zulu Man with Some Power|-
! scope="row"| "Gotta Keep PUshing"
| rowspan="2" | 2022
| Snoop Dogg, Sleepy Brown
| BODR|-
! scope="row"| "Wild Chapter"
| Conway the Machine, Novel
| God Don't Make Mistakes|-
|}

 Production discography 

 See also 
 T.I. videography
 List of awards and nominations received by T.I.
 P$C discography
 Bankroll Mafia discography

 Notes 

A  "I'm Serious" did not enter the Hot R&B/Hip-Hop Songs chart, but peaked at number 10 on the Bubbling Under R&B/Hip-Hop Singles chart, which acts as a 25-song extension to the Hot R&B/Hip-Hop Songs chart.
B  "That's All She Wrote" did not enter the Hot R&B/Hip-Hop Songs chart, but peaked at number 1 on the Bubbling Under R&B/Hip-Hop Singles chart, which acts as a 25-song extension to the Hot R&B/Hip-Hop Songs chart.
C  "Poppin Bottles" did not enter the Billboard Hot 100, but peaked at number 15 on the Bubbling Under Hot 100 Singles chart, which acts as a 25-song extension to the Hot 100.
D  "Pac's Life" did not enter the Billboard Hot 100, but peaked at number 19 on the Bubbling Under Hot 100 Singles chart, which acts as a 25-song extension to the Hot 100.
E  "Whatever U Like" did not enter the Billboard Hot 100, but peaked at number 4 on the Bubbling Under Hot 100 Singles chart, which acts as a 25-song extension to the Hot 100. It did not enter the Hot R&B/Hip-Hop Songs chart, but peaked at number 13 on the Bubbling Under R&B/Hip-Hop Singles chart, which acts as a 25-song extension to the Hot R&B/Hip-Hop Songs chart.
F  "That's Right" did not enter the Hot R&B/Hip-Hop Songs chart, but peaked at number 5 on the Bubbling Under R&B/Hip-Hop Singles chart, which acts as a 25-song extension to the Hot R&B/Hip-Hop Songs chart.
G  "Make Up Bag" did not enter the Billboard Hot 100, but peaked at number 3 on the Bubbling Under Hot 100 Singles chart, which acts as a 25-song extension to the Hot 100.
H  "Ready Set Go" did not enter the Hot R&B/Hip-Hop Songs chart, but peaked at number 10 on the Bubbling Under R&B/Hip-Hop Singles chart, which acts as a 25-song extension to the Hot R&B/Hip-Hop Songs chart.
I  "F.A.M.E." did not enter the Billboard Hot 100, but peaked at number 19 on the Bubbling Under Hot 100 Singles chart, which acts as a 25-song extension to the Hot 100.
J  "Back 2 Life (Live It Up)" did not enter the Billboard Hot 100, but peaked at number 9 on the Bubbling Under Hot 100 Singles chart, which acts as a 25-song extension to the Hot 100. It did not enter the Hot R&B/Hip-Hop Songs chart, but peaked at number 8 on the Bubbling Under R&B/Hip-Hop Singles chart, which acts as a 25-song extension to the Hot R&B/Hip-Hop Songs chart.
K  "Ride wit Me" did not enter the Billboard Hot 100, but peaked at number 11 on the Bubbling Under Hot 100 Singles chart, which acts as a 25-song extension to the Hot 100. It did not enter the Hot R&B/Hip-Hop Songs chart, but peaked at number 11 on the Bubbling Under R&B/Hip-Hop Singles chart, which acts as a 25-song extension to the Hot R&B/Hip-Hop Songs chart.
L  "Front Back" did not enter the Hot R&B/Hip-Hop Songs chart, but peaked at number 11 on the Bubbling Under R&B/Hip-Hop Singles chart, which acts as a 25-song extension to the Hot R&B/Hip-Hop Songs chart.
M  "Wish You Would" did not enter the Billboard Hot 100, but peaked at number 14 on the Bubbling Under Hot 100 Singles chart, which acts as a 25-song extension to the Hot 100. It did not enter the Hot R&B/Hip-Hop Songs chart, but peaked at number 18 on the Bubbling Under R&B/Hip-Hop Singles chart, which acts as a 25-song extension to the Hot R&B/Hip-Hop Songs chart.
N  "Ya Hear Me" did not enter the Billboard Hot 100, but peaked at number 18 on the Bubbling Under Hot 100 Singles chart, which acts as a 25-song extension to the Hot 100.
O  "I Can't Help It" did not enter the Billboard Hot 100, but peaked at number 3 on the Bubbling Under Hot 100 Singles chart, which acts as a 25-song extension to the Hot 100.
P  "No Mercy" did not enter the Billboard Hot 100, but peaked at number 23 on the Bubbling Under Hot 100 Singles chart, which acts as a 25-song extension to the Hot 100.

Q  "Here Ye, Hear Ye" did not enter the Hot R&B/Hip-Hop Songs chart, but peaked at number 19 on the Bubbling Under R&B/Hip-Hop Singles chart, which acts as a 25-song extension to the Hot R&B/Hip-Hop Songs chart.
R  "Like That" did not enter the Billboard Hot 100, but peaked at number 13 on the Bubbling Under Hot 100 Singles chart, which acts as a 25-song extension to the Hot 100. It did not enter the Hot R&B/Hip-Hop Songs chart, but peaked at number 5 on the Bubbling Under R&B/Hip-Hop Singles chart, which acts as a 25-song extension to the Hot R&B/Hip-Hop Songs chart.
S  "Stomp" did not enter the Hot R&B/Hip-Hop Songs chart, but peaked at number 10 on the Bubbling Under R&B/Hip-Hop Singles chart, which acts as a 25-song extension to the Hot R&B/Hip-Hop Songs chart.
T  "Touchdown" did not enter the Billboard Hot 100, but peaked at number 9 on the Bubbling Under Hot 100 Singles chart, which acts as a 25-song extension to the Hot 100.
U  "56 Bars (Intro)" did not enter the Billboard Hot 100, but peaked at number 19 on the Bubbling Under Hot 100 Singles chart, which acts as a 25-song extension to the Hot 100.
V  "My Life Your Entertainment" did not enter the Billboard Hot 100, but peaked at number 19 on the Bubbling Under Hot 100 Singles chart, which acts as a 25-song extension to the Hot 100.
W  "I'm Illy" did not enter the Hot R&B/Hip-Hop Songs chart, but peaked at number 12 on the Bubbling Under R&B/Hip-Hop Singles chart, which acts as a 25-song extension to the Hot R&B/Hip-Hop Songs chart.
X  "In My Bag" did not enter the Hot R&B/Hip-Hop Songs chart, but peaked at number 7 on the Bubbling Under R&B/Hip-Hop Singles chart, which acts as a 25-song extension to the Hot R&B/Hip-Hop Songs chart.
Y  "Freeze Me" did not enter the Hot R&B/Hip-Hop Songs chart, but peaked at number 14 on the Bubbling Under R&B/Hip-Hop Singles chart, which acts as a 25-song extension to the Hot R&B/Hip-Hop Songs chart.
Z  "Welcome to the World" did not enter the Billboard Hot 100, but peaked at number 17 on the Bubbling Under Hot 100 Singles chart, which acts as a 25-song extension to the Hot 100.
AA  "Castle Walls" did not enter the Billboard Hot 100, but peaked at number 5 on the Bubbling Under Hot 100 Singles chart, which acts as a 25-song extension to the Hot 100.
AB  "Pyro" did not enter the Hot R&B/Hip-Hop Songs chart, but peaked at number 13 on the Bubbling Under R&B/Hip-Hop Singles chart, which acts as a 25-song extension to the Hot R&B/Hip-Hop Songs chart.
AC  "Fireworkz" (Remix) did not enter the Hot R&B/Hip-Hop Songs chart, but peaked at number 3 on the Bubbling Under R&B/Hip-Hop Singles chart, which acts as a 25-song extension to the Hot R&B/Hip-Hop Songs chart.
AD  "Arena" did not enter the Billboard Hot 100, but peaked at number 16 on the Bubbling Under Hot 100 Singles chart, which acts as a 25-song extension to the Hot 100.
AE  "Plain Jane" did not enter the Hot R&B/Hip-Hop Songs chart, but peaked at number 10 on the Bubbling Under R&B/Hip-Hop Singles chart, which acts as a 25-song extension to the Hot R&B/Hip-Hop Songs chart.

-->
BE  "Bitches & Bottles (Let's Get It Started)" did not enter the Billboard'' Hot 100, but peaked at number 9 on the Bubbling Under Hot 100 Singles chart, which acts as a 25-song extension to the Hot 100.

References

External links

Discography
Discographies of American artists
Hip hop discographies